Marc-Guillaume Alexis Vadier (17 July 1736 – 14 December 1828) was a major French politician of the French Revolution. He is sometimes called the "Great Inquisitor", for his active participation in the Reign of Terror. During this time, he was in charge of the Comité de Sûreté Générale, which was tasked with the prosecution of the so-called enemies of the Revolution. He is probably one of the main actors in the fall of Robespierre, which was his political rival.

Early career
Son of a wealthy family in Pamiers, Ariège, he served in the army of the king Louis XV, taking part in the Seven Years' War and the Battle of Rossbach on 5 November 1757. Upon his return to France in 1758, Vadier acquired large tracts of land in Pamiers and in 1770 purchased the office of conseiller (magistrate), which brought him into conflict with many of the local aristocracy and affluent bourgeoisie. Elected as deputy to the Third Estate in the Estates-General of France for the County of Foix (in 1789), Vadier took no prominent part in that assembly.

He left his office as representative in the National Constituent Assembly of the Constitutional Monarchy (September 1791), returning to Ariège département, becoming president of the district tribunal in Mirepoix, contributing to the creation of new revolutionary institutions throughout the region. With the overthrow of the monarchy one year later, (10 August 1792), he was elected to the National Convention (3 September), sat among the Montagnards, joined the Jacobin Club, and voted in favor of Louis XVI' execution (sans appel ni sursis – without appeal or delay) on 17 January 1793. An opponent of the Girondists, Vadier opposed the proscription of Jean-Paul Marat, and following the fall of the Girondists travelled to Ariège to actively oppose the Federalist Revolt there. On 14 September 1793, he was named member of the Committee of General Security, soon becoming its President, where he made his deepest mark on the Revolution.

Role in Terror and conspiracies
In this capacity, he was one of the principal actors of the Reign of Terror, and played an important role in the denunciations and the guillotining of Fabre d'Églantine, François Chabot, Georges Danton, and finally Maximilien Robespierre (preparing the way for the Thermidorian Reaction). On 15 June 1794 he used false charges against Catherine Théot to ridicule Robespierre's mysticism and the Cult of the Supreme Being, also hinting to the Convention that Théot's prophecies were being used in order to replace the collective body with Robespierre's own dictatorship. Vadier, nonetheless, was implicated with the Montagnard terrorists and ordered under house arrest by the Convention on 2 March 1795 and sent for trial on the 29th as opinion rapidly shifted against the Montagnards in the wake of 9 Thermidor.

After the Reaction, Vadier was transported together with Jacques Nicolas Billaud-Varenne and Jean-Marie Collot d'Herbois to French Guiana, but was amnestied by the Directory, and later, in the April 1796, took part in the failed Conspiracy of the Equals. Acquitted by the courts, he nonetheless remained in prison in Cherbourg until 1799. Placed under house arrest in Paris, a deputy during Napoleon's Hundred Days, he was compelled to go into exile in Brussels after the Second Restoration, and died in Brussels.

References

Further reading 
 
 Available at The Library of Congress, Washington DC DC146.V2 D87 1989; The British Library, London HMNTS YA.1990.b.1993; The University of California Library, Berkeley DC146.V2.D8 1989.

Jacobins
1736 births
1828 deaths
People from Pamiers
Regicides of Louis XVI
People involved in the Conspiracy of the Equals
French atheists
People of the Reign of Terror
Presidents of the National Convention